Frédéric Borel is a French architect, born in 1959 in Roanne (France). He graduated from the École spéciale d'architecture (Paris) in 1982, and then began to work with Christian de Portzamparc. He created his own agency in Paris in 1984. His buildings are examples of deconstructivist architecture.

Some buildings
 Apartment building boulevard de Belleville, Paris (1989)
 Apartment building rue Oberkampf, Paris (1994)
 Apartment building rue Pelleport, Paris (1999)
 Tribunal, Narbonne (2004)
 National school of architecture Paris-Val de Seine (2007)

External links 
 Frédéric Borel's website
  Presentation of his work on the Archilad website
 

20th-century French architects
Modernist architecture in France
People from Roanne
1959 births
Living people
Members of the Académie d'architecture
Commandeurs of the Ordre des Arts et des Lettres
École Spéciale d'Architecture alumni